The 2012–13 Brooklyn Nets season was the franchise's 46th season, its 37th in the National Basketball Association (NBA), and its first season following its relocation from New Jersey to Brooklyn, New York, after the 2011–12 season.  The Nets finished with a record of 49–33, their first winning season since 2005–06,  the 2nd best record in the Atlantic Division and the 4th best in the Eastern Conference.  When considering the Nets' time in the NBA only, the 49–33 record is also tied for the second best in franchise history at the time, and the 23–18 record on the road was the first winning record on the road in franchise history.

In the 2013 NBA Playoffs, the Nets played an injury-plagued Chicago Bulls in the first round to seven games, but lost the decisive game at home 93–99.

Key dates
 June 28: The 2012 NBA draft took place at the Prudential Center in Newark, New Jersey.
 November 1: The Nets were scheduled to begin the 2012–13 campaign in the newly built Barclays Center in Brooklyn, New York against the New York Knicks. However, due to damage caused by Hurricane Sandy all across New York City, the game was postponed.
 November 3: The Nets' 2012–13 campaign in the newly built Barclays Center in Brooklyn, New York home opener for the Nets started out against the Toronto Raptors.
 December 27: The Nets fire head coach Avery Johnson after losing 10 of 13 games. P. J. Carlesimo is named interim head coach.

Draft picks

Future draft picks

Credits

No picks owing

Debits

2013 second round draft pick to Minnesota

Brooklyn's own 2013 2nd round pick to Minnesota via Minnesota and New Orleans. [Brooklyn-Minnesota, 6/24/2011 and then Minnesota-New Orleans 7/13/2012 and then Minnesota-New Orleans-Phoenix, 7/27/2012]

2014 second round draft pick to Boston

Brooklyn's own 2014 2nd round pick to Boston. (Boston – Brooklyn, 6/23/2011)

2015 second round draft pick to Utah

Brooklyn's own 2015 2nd round pick to Utah (Brooklyn – Utah, 12/22/2011)

2016 second round draft pick to L.A. Clippers

The L.A. Clippers have the right to swap their own 2016 2nd round pick with Brooklyn's 2016 2nd round pick provided the L.A. Clippers' 2nd round pick is 31–55. If The L.A. Clippers pick is 56–60, Brooklyn's obligations to the L.A. Clippers shall be extinguished. (Brooklyn-L.A. Clippers, 7/11/2012)

2017 second round draft pick to Atlanta

Brooklyn's own 2017 2nd round pick to Atlanta. (Atlanta-Brooklyn, 7/11/2012)

Roster

Pre-season

|- style="background:#cfc;"
| 1
| October 13
| @ Philadelphia
| 
| Lopez & Watson (19)
| Brook Lopez (9)
| Deron Williams (6)
| Boardwalk Hall6,887
| 1–0
|- style="background:#cfc;"
| 2
| October 15
| Washington
| 
| Brook Lopez (18)
| Brook Lopez (11)
| Deron Williams (9)
| Barclays Center14,219
| 2–0
|- style="background:#cfc;"
| 3
| October 16
| @ Boston
| 
| Andray Blatche (23)
| Reggie Evans (10)
| Tyshawn Taylor (5)
| TD Garden18,624
| 3–0
|- style="background:#fcc;"
| 4
| October 18
| Boston
| 
| Brook Lopez (14)
| Andray Blatche (9)
| Deron Williams (6)
| Barclays Center14,192
| 3–1
|- style="background:#fcc;"
| 5
| October 19
| Philadelphia
| 
| Brook Lopez (23)
| Brook Lopez (9)
| Bogans & Williams (4)
| Barclays Center13,270
| 3–2
|- style="background:#fcc;"
| 6
| October 24
| New York
| 
| Deron Williams (22)
| Andray Blatche (10)
| Three players (2)
| Nassau Coliseum15,957
| 3–3

Regular season

Standings

Game log

|- style="background:#cfc;"
| 1
| November 3
| Toronto
| 
| Brook Lopez (27)
| Reggie Evans (13)
| Deron Williams (9)
| Barclays Center17,732
| 1–0
|- style="background:#fcc;"
| 2
| November 5
| Minnesota
| 
| Joe Johnson (19)
| Brook Lopez (9)
| Deron Williams (14)
| Barclays Center14,017
| 1–1
|- style="background:#fcc;"
| 3
| November 7
| @ Miami
| 
| Deron Williams (14)
| Kris Humphries (11)
| Deron Williams (3)
| American Airlines Arena19,627
| 1–2
|- style="background:#cfc;"
| 4
| November 9
| @ Orlando
| 
| Andray Blatche (15)
| Brook Lopez (10)
| Three players (4)
| Amway Center17,532
| 2–2
|- style="background:#cfc;"
| 5
| November 11
| Orlando
| 
| Brook Lopez (20)
| Kris Humphries (21)
| Deron Williams (7)
| Barclays Center16,523
| 3–2
|- style="background:#cfc;"
| 6
| November 13
| Cleveland
| 
| Deron Williams (26)
| Reggie Evans (8)
| Deron Williams (10)
| Barclays Center17,032
| 4–2
|- style="background:#cfc;"
| 7
| November 15
| Boston
| 
| Lopez & Williams (24)
| Kris Humphries (13)
| Deron Williams (8)
| Barclays Center17,732
| 5–2
|- style="background:#cfc;"
| 8
| November 18
| @ Sacramento
| 
| Andray Blatche (22)
| Kris Humphries (10)
| Deron Williams (10)
| Sleep Train Arena11,965
| 6–2
|- style="background:#fcc;"
| 9
| November 20
| @ L. A. Lakers
| 
| Brook Lopez (23)
| Reggie Evans (11)
| Deron Williams (10)
| Staples Center18,997
| 6–3
|- style="background:#fcc;"
| 10
| November 21
| @ Golden State
| 
| Brook Lopez (22)
| Andray Blatche (7)
| Deron Williams (8)
| Oracle Arena18,374
| 6–4
|- style="background:#cfc;"
| 11
| November 23
| L. A. Clippers
| 
| Brook Lopez (26)
| Reggie Evans (12)
| Deron Williams (8)
| Barclays Center17,732
| 7–4
|- style="background:#cfc;"
| 12
| November 25
| Portland
| 
| Joe Johnson (21)
| Reggie Evans (14)
| Deron Williams (12)
| Barclays Center16,542
| 8–4
|- style="background:#cfc;"
| 13
| November 26
| New York
| 
| Brook Lopez (22)
| Reggie Evans (14)
| Deron Williams (14)
| Barclays Center17,732
| 9–4
|- style="background:#cfc;"
| 14
| November 28
| @ Boston
| 
| Joe Johnson (18)
| Andray Blatche (13)
| Deron Williams (7)
| TD Garden18,624
| 10–4
|- style="background:#cfc;"
| 15
| November 30
| @ Orlando
| 
| Joe Johnson (22)
| Reggie Evans (10)
| Deron Williams (7)
| Amway Center17,103
| 11–4

|- style="background:#fcc;"
| 16
| December 1
| @ Miami
| 
| Andray Blatche (20)
| Gerald Wallace (9)
| Deron Williams (12)
| American Airlines Arena19,961
| 11–5
|- style="background:#fcc;"
| 17
| December 4
| Oklahoma City
| 
| Deron Williams (33)
| Kris Humphries (12)
| Deron Williams (7)
| Barclays Center17,732
| 11–6
|- style="background:#fcc;"
| 18
| December 7
| Golden State
| 
| Joe Johnson (32)
| Andray Blatche (15)
| Deron Williams (8)
| Barclays Center17,732
| 11–7
|- style="background:#fcc;"
| 19
| December 9
| Milwaukee
| 
| Deron Williams (18)
| Gerald Wallace (16)
| Deron Williams (8)
| Barclays Center16,390
| 11–8
|- style="background:#fcc;"
| 20
| December 11
| New York
| 
| Andray Blatche (23)
| Reggie Evans (18)
| Deron Williams (10)
| Barclays Center17,732
| 11–9
|- style="background:#cfc;"
| 21
| December 12
| @ Toronto
| 
| Joe Johnson (23)
| Reggie Evans (11)
| Johnson & Williams (4)
| Air Canada Centre18,847
| 12–9
|- style="background:#cfc;"
| 22
| December 14
| Detroit
| 
| Joe Johnson (28)
| Evans & Wallace (10)
| Deron Williams (6)
| Barclays Center15,797
| 13–9
|- style="background:#fcc;"
| 23
| December 15
| @ Chicago
| 
| Deron Williams (24)
| Brook Lopez (10)
| Johnson & Williams (5)
| United Center21,866
| 13–10
|- style="background:#fcc;"
| 24
| December 18
| Utah
| 
| Joe Johnson (21)
| Kris Humphries (11)
| Deron Williams (5)
| Barclays Center15,835
| 13–11
|- style="background:#fcc;"
| 25
| December 19
| @ New York
| 
| Joe Johnson (17)
| Brook Lopez (10)
| Deron Williams (10)
| Madison Square Garden19,033
| 13–12
|- style="background:#cfc;"
| 26
| December 23
| Philadelphia
| 
| Joe Johnson (22)
| Gerald Wallace (9)
| Gerald Wallace (6)
| Barclays Center17,732
| 14–12
|- style="background:#fcc;"
| 27
| December 25
| Boston
| 
| Lopez & Wallace (15)
| Brook Lopez (8)
| Deron Williams (6)
| Barclays Center17,732
| 14–13
|- style="background:#fcc;"
| 28
| December 26
| @ Milwaukee
| 
| Brook Lopez (21)
| Gerald Wallace (12)
| Gerald Wallace (8)
| Bradley Center13,102
| 14–14
|- style="background:#cfc;"
| 29
| December 28
| Charlotte
| 
| Brook Lopez (26)
| Reggie Evans(13)
| Gerald Wallace (6)
| Barclays Center17,732
| 15–14
|- style="background:#cfc;"
| 30
| December 29
| Cleveland
| 
| Brook Lopez (35)
| Brook Lopez (11)
| Deron Williams (7)
| Barclays Center17,732
| 16–14
|- style="background:#fcc;"
| 31
| December 31
| @ San Antonio
| 
| MarShon Brooks (16)
| Reggie Evans(9)
| Five players (2)
| AT&T Center18,581
| 16–15

|- style="background:#cfc;"
| 32
| January 2
| @ Oklahoma City
| 
| Joe Johnson (33)
| Kris Humphries (7)
| Deron Williams (13)
| Chesapeake Energy Arena18,203
| 17–15
|- style="background:#cfc;"
| 33
| January 4
| @ Washington
| 
| Brook Lopez (27)
| Brook Lopez (13)
| Deron Williams (10)
| Verizon Center16,006
| 18–15
|- style="background:#cfc;"
| 34
| January 5
| Sacramento
| 
| Brook Lopez (18)
| Reggie Evans(12)
| Deron Williams (7)
| Barclays Center17,732
| 19–15
|- style="background:#cfc;"
| 35
| January 8
| @ Philadelphia
| 
| Deron Williams (22)
| Reggie Evans(23)
| Three players (5)
| Wells Fargo Center16,167
| 20–15
|- style="background:#cfc;"
| 36
| January 11
| Phoenix
| 
| Joe Johnson (19)
| Reggie Evans (15)
| Deron Williams (6)
| Barclays Center16,272
| 21–15
|- style="background:#cfc;"
| 37
| January 13
| Indiana
| 
| Deron Williams (22)
| Humphries & Lopez (9)
| Deron Williams (9)
| Barclays Center16,499
| 22–15
|- style="background:#cfc;"
| 38
| January 15
| Toronto
| 
| Brook Lopez (22)
| Brook Lopez (9)
| Deron Williams (7)
| Barclays Center16,236
| 23–15
|- style="background:#fcc;"
| 39
| January 16
| @ Atlanta
| 
| Brook Lopez (22)
| Brook Lopez (9)
| Deron Williams (9)
| Philips Arena15,029
| 23–16
|- style="background:#cfc;"
| 40
| January 18
| Atlanta
| 
| Deron Williams (24)
| Reggie Evans (20)
| Deron Williams (7)
| Barclays Center17,732
| 24–16
|- style="background:#cfc;"
| 41
| January 21
| @ New York
| 
| Joe Johnson (25)
| Kris Humphries (13)
| Deron Williams (12)
| Madison Square Garden19,033
| 25–16
|- style="background:#cfc;"
| 42
| January 23
| @ Minnesota
| 
| Brook Lopez (22)
| Kris Humphries (8)
| Deron Williams (8)
| Target Center15,785
| 26–16
|- style="background:#fcc;"
| 43
| January 25
| @ Memphis
| 
| Brook Lopez (18)
| Reggie Evans (10)
| Deron Williams (6)
| FedEx Forum16,911
| 26–17
|- style="background:#fcc;"
| 44
| January 26
| @ Houston
| 
| Deron Williams (27)
| Reggie Evans (8)
| Deron Williams (11)
| Toyota Center18,236
| 26–18
|- style="background:#cfc;"
| 45
| January 28
| Orlando
| 
| Deron Williams (20)
| Reggie Evans (10)
| Deron Williams (9)
| Barclays Center16,480
| 27–18
|- style="background:#fcc;"
| 46
| January 30
| Miami
| 
| Brook Lopez (21)
| Brook Lopez (7)
| Joe Johnson (6)
| Barclays Center17,732
| 27–19

|- style="background:#cfc;"
| 47
| February 1
| Chicago
| 
| Brook Lopez (20)
| Gerald Wallace (13)
| Deron Williams (6)
| Barclays Center17,732
| 28–19
|- style="background:#fcc;"
| 48
| February 5
| L. A. Lakers
| 
| Brook Lopez (30)
| Evans & Lopez (11)
| Deron Williams (6)
| Barclays Center17,732
| 28–20
|- style="background:#cfc;"
| 49
| February 6
| @ Detroit
| 
| Brook Lopez (17)
| Reggie Evans (14)
| Deron Williams (9)
| The Palace of Auburn Hills12,576
| 29–20
|- style="background:#fcc;"
| 50
| February 8
| @ Washington
| 
| Deron Williams (20)
| Reggie Evans (13)
| Deron Williams (5)
| Verizon Center19,614
| 29–21
|- style="background:#fcc;"
| 51
| February 10
| San Antonio
| 
| Joe Johnson (19)
| Evans & Lopez (9)
| Brook Lopez (4)
| Barclays Center17,014
| 29–22
|- style="background:#cfc;"
| 52
| February 11
| @ Indiana
| 
| Brook Lopez (25)
| Reggie Evans (22)
| C. J. Watson (3)
| Bankers Life Fieldhouse11,672
| 30–22
|- style="background:#cfc;"
| 53
| February 13
| Denver
| 
| Joe Johnson (26)
| Gerald Wallace (9)
| Joe Johnson (9)
| Barclays Center17,251
| 31–22
|- align="center"
|colspan="9" bgcolor="#bbcaff"|All-Star Break
|- style="background:#cfc;"
| 54
| February 19
| Milwaukee
| 
| Joe Johnson (24)
| Evans & Lopez (9)
| Deron Williams (9)
| Barclays Center17,334
| 32–22
|- style="background:#cfc;"
| 55
| February 20
| @ Milwaukee
| 
| Deron Williams (23)
| Andray Blatche (12)
| Deron Williams (8)
| Bradley Center14,563
| 33–22
|- style="background:#fcc;"
| 56
| February 22
| Houston
| 
| Brook Lopez (27)
| Reggie Evans (13)
| Deron Williams (13)
| Barclays Center17,732
| 33–23
|- style="background:#fcc;"
| 57
| February 24
| Memphis
| 
| Deron Williams (24)
| Reggie Evans (14)
| C. J. Watson (4)
| Barclays Center17,098
| 33–24
|- style="background:#cfc;"
| 58
| February 26
| @ New Orleans
| 
| Deron Williams (33)
| Brook Lopez (7)
| Deron Williams (8)
| New Orleans Arena12,651
| 34–24

|- style="background:#fcc;"
| 59
| March 1
| Dallas
| 
| Deron Williams (24)
| Reggie Evans (11)
| Joe Johnson (6)
| Barclays Center17,732
| 34–25
|- style="background:#fcc;"
| 60
| March 2
| @ Chicago
| 
| Brook Lopez (22)
| Reggie Evans (10)
| Deron Williams (6)
| United Center22,414
| 34–26
|- style="background:#cfc;"
| 61
| March 6
| @ Charlotte
| 
| Joe Johnson (22)
| Reggie Evans (16)
| Deron Williams (8)
| Time Warner Cable Arena13,382
| 35–26
|- style="background:#cfc;"
| 62
| March 8
| Washington
| 
| Deron Williams (42)
| Reggie Evans (24)
| Gerald Wallace (5)
| Barclays Center17,732
| 36–26
|- style="background:#cfc;"
| 63
| March 9
| @ Atlanta
| 
| Brook Lopez (18)
| Reggie Evans (9)
| Deron Williams (6)
| Philips Arena17,282
| 37–26
|- style="background:#fcc;"
| 64
| March 11
| @ Philadelphia
| 
| Deron Williams (27)
| Reggie Evans (11)
| Deron Williams (13)
| Wells Fargo Center16,789
| 37–27
|- style="background:#cfc;"
| 65
| March 12
| New Orleans
| 
| Brook Lopez (26)
| Reggie Evans (13)
| Deron Williams (13)
| Barclays Center17,732
| 38–27
|- style="background:#fcc;"
| 66
| March 17
| Atlanta
| 
| Joe Johnson (18)
| Reggie Evans (22)
| Deron Williams (8)
| Barclays Center17,732
| 38–28
|- style="background:#cfc;"
| 67
| March 18
| @ Detroit
| 
| Deron Williams (31)
| Reggie Evans (11)
| Deron Williams (5)
| The Palace of Auburn Hills16,072
| 39–28
|- style="background:#cfc;"
| 68
| March 20
| @ Dallas
| 
| Brook Lopez (38)
| Reggie Evans (22)
| Deron Williams (6)
| American Airlines Center19,962
| 40–28
|- style="background:#fcc;"
| 69
| March 23
| @ L. A. Clippers
| 
| Brook Lopez (18)
| Reggie Evans (16)
| Deron Williams (9)
| Staples Center19,506
| 40–29
|- style="background:#cfc;"
| 70
| March 24
| @ Phoenix
| 
| Brook Lopez (21)
| Reggie Evans (10)
| Deron Williams (11)
| US Airways Center14,800
| 41–29
|- style="background:#cfc;"
| 71
| March 27
| @ Portland
| 
| Brook Lopez (28)
| Reggie Evans (26)
| Deron Williams (10)
| Rose Garden20,127
| 42–29
|- style="background:#fcc;"
| 72
| March 29
| @ Denver
| 
| Deron Williams (19)
| Reggie Evans (16)
| Marshon Brooks (5)
| Pepsi Center19,155
| 42–30
|- style="background:#fcc;"
| 73
| March 30
| @ Utah
| 
| Brook Lopez (27)
| Reggie Evans (16)
| Deron Williams (11)
| EnergySolutions Arena18,008
| 42–31

|- style="background:#cfc;"
| 74
| April 3
| @ Cleveland
| 
| Marshon Brooks (27)
| Reggie Evans (18)
| Deron Williams (8)
| Quicken Loans Arena14,863
| 43–31
|- style="background:#fcc;"
| 75
| April 4
| Chicago
| 
| Deron Williams (30)
| Reggie Evans (13)
| Deron Williams (10)
| Barclays Center17,732
| 43–32
|- style="background:#cfc;"
| 76
| April 6
| Charlotte
| 
| Deron Williams (32)
| Reggie Evans (20)
| Deron Williams (6)
| Barclays Center17,444
| 44–32
|- style="background:#cfc;"
| 77
| April 9
| Philadelphia
| 
| Brook Lopez (29)
| Reggie Evans (24)
| Deron Williams (4)
| Barclays Center17,192
| 45–32
|- style="background:#cfc;"
| 78
| April 10
| @ Boston
| 
| Deron Williams (29)
| Reggie Evans (14)
| Deron Williams (12)
| TD Garden18,624
| 46–32
|- style="background:#cfc;"
| 79
| April 12
| @ Indiana
| 
| Deron Williams (33)
| Reggie Evans (12)
| Deron Williams (14)
| Bankers Life Fieldhouse18,165
| 47–32
|- style="background:#fcc;"
| 80
| April 14
| @ Toronto
| 
| Deron Williams (30)
| Reggie Evans (16)
| Deron Williams (7)
| Air Canada Centre17,617
| 47–33
|- style="background:#cfc;"
| 81
| April 15
| Washington
| 
| Blatche & Humphries (20)
| Andray Blatche (12)
| Tyshawn Taylor (3)
| Barclays Center16,774
| 48–33
|- style="background:#cfc;"
| 82
| April 17
| Detroit
| 
| Brook Lopez (20)
| Reggie Evans (11)
| Deron Williams (6)
| Barclays Center16,868
| 49–33

Playoffs

Game log

|- style="background:#cfc;"
| 1
| April 20
| Chicago
| 
| Deron Williams (22)
| Reggie Evans (13)
| Deron Williams (7)
| Barclays Center17,732
| 1–0
|- style="background:#fcc;"
| 2
| April 22
| Chicago
| 
| Brook Lopez (21)
| Reggie Evans (8)
| Deron Williams (10)
| Barclays Center17,732
| 1–1
|- style="background:#fcc;"
| 3
| April 25
| @ Chicago
| 
| Brook Lopez (22)
| Reggie Evans (12)
| Deron Williams (4)
| United Center21,672
| 1–2
|- style="background:#fcc;"
| 4
| April 27
| @ Chicago
| 
| Deron Williams (32)
| Reggie Evans (13)
| Deron Williams (10)
| United Center21,758
| 1–3
|- style="background:#cfc;"
| 5
| April 29
| Chicago
| |
| Brook Lopez (28)
| Reggie Evans (12)
| Deron Williams (10)
| Barclays Center17,732
| 2–3
|- style="background:#cfc;"
| 6
| May 2
| @ Chicago
| |
| Three players (17)
| Reggie Evans (15)
| Deron Williams (11)
| United Center21,810
| 3–3
|- style="background:#fcc;"
| 7
| May 4
| Chicago
| |
| Deron Williams (24)
| Reggie Evans (13)
| Deron Williams (7)
| Barclays Center17,732
| 3–4

Player statistics

Regular season

Playoffs

Player Statistics Citation:

Transactions

Overview

Trades

Free agents

References

External links
 2012–13 Brooklyn Nets season at ESPN
 2012–13 Brooklyn Nets season Official Site

Brooklyn Nets season
Brooklyn Nets seasons
Brooklyn Nets
Brooklyn Nets
2010s in Brooklyn
Events in Brooklyn, New York
Prospect Heights, Brooklyn